Sriramachandrulu is a 2003 Telugu-language comedy film produced by Srikanth I and Anil Kumar Koneru and directed by Srikankh I. Starring Rajendra Prasad, Sivaji, Rambha, Raasi, Sindhu Menon, Brahmanandam and Kovai Sarala,  with music composed by Ghantadi Krishna. The film recorded as Super Hit at box office. last This was Rambha's final Telugu film to date as a leading actress.

Plot
Sriram, Chandra, and Ram Babu are friends and also wayward husbands of three dutiful wives Sailaja, Pallavi, Savitri all of them stay in the same colony. Their daily schedule includes boozing and troubling their wives with their behavior. Once they get to save a beautiful girl Sundari Devi a multimillionaire, from an accident, when she asks them if they are bachelors they say that they are. Then she says that she is willing to marry one of these three guys who impress her the best. The rest of the story is about how these trios tries to prompt themselves before Sundari and how their dutiful wives teach them a lesson!

Cast

Rajendra Prasad as Sriram 
Sivaji as Chandram
Rambha as Sundari Devi
Raasi as Sailaja
Sindhu Menon as Pallavi
Brahmanandam as Rambabu 
Kovai Sarala as Savitri
M. S. Narayana as Driver
Venu Madhav as Perfect Paramkusam 
Mallikarjuna Rao as Inspector
Raghu Babu
Krishna Bhagawan as Sundari's Secretary
Kondavalasa as Nithin
Shakeela as Srikanya
Gundu Hanumantha Rao
Gowtham Raju
Ram Jagan
Jenny

Soundtrack

Music was composed by Gantadi Krishna and released by Supreme Music Company.

References

External links
 

2003 films
2000s Telugu-language films